The 1950 New South Wales Rugby Football League premiership was the forty-third season of Sydney’s top-level rugby league competition, Australia’s first. Ten teams from across the city contested the premiership during the season which culminated in a grand final between South Sydney and Western Suburbs.

Teams

Ladder

Finals

Final

In a close and physical encounter South Sydney held a 17–11 six point lead at half time. The second half was tryless, but South Sydney kept ahead on penalty goals throughout.

Souths’ captain Jack Rayner led the team in fine style to their first title in eighteen years while the club’s internationals all stood up and were counted. Forward Bernie Purcell kicked five long-range penalty goals in succession; fullback Clive Churchill ran Wests’ heavyweight forwards off their legs and winger Johnny Graves scored two great tries.

South Sydney Rabbitohs  21 (Tries: Graves 2, Smailes. Goals: Purcell 5, Graves 1.)

Western Suburbs Magpies 15 (Tries: Holman. Goals: Keato 6.)

Player statistics
The following statistics are as of the conclusion of Round 18.

Top 5 point scorers

Top 5 try scorers

Top 5 goal scorers

References

External links
 Rugby League Tables - Season 1950 AFL Tables
 Results:1941-1950 at rabbitohs.com.au
 1950 Labor Daily Cup at rleague.com
 NSWRFL season 1950 at rugbyleagueproject.org

New South Wales Rugby League premiership
NSWRFL Season